The kurash competitions at the 2021 Southeast Asian Games took place at Hoài Đức District Sporting Hall in Hanoi, Vietnam from 10 to 13 May 2022.

Medal table

Medalists

Men

Women

References

External links
 

2021 Southeast Asian Games events